The Ridgewood Open is a defunct WTA Tour affiliated women's tennis tournament played in 1983. It was held in Ridgewood, New Jersey in the United States and played on indoor carpet courts.

Results

Singles

Doubles

References
 WTA Results Archive

 
Defunct tennis tournaments in the United States
Carpet court tennis tournaments
Indoor tennis tournaments
WTA Tour